Talisay, officially the Municipality of Talisay, is a 4th class municipality in the province of Camarines Norte, Philippines. According to the 2020 census, it has a population of 27,244 people.

Rice and coconut farming are the major agricultural activities for most of the barangays and fishing is the second thriving industry particularly in the coastal barangays.

Talisayons have a deep concern for education. A family no matter how poor, sends their children to school. Talisay has a very long list of successful professionals in various fields such as medicine, law, engineering, architecture, education, law enforcement and military service, banking, business, sports, entertainment, marketing, and many more. The incumbent mayor is Dondon Mancenido. Talisayons are fond of arts and music. The municipality holds singing and dance competitions throughout the year usually held at the public plaza.

Geography

Barangay
Talisay is politically subdivided into 15 barangays.
 Binanuaan
 Caawigan
 Cahabaan
 Calintaan
 Del Carmen
 Gabon
 Itomang 
 Poblacion
 San Francisco
 San Isidro
 San Jose
 San Nicolas
 Santa Cruz 
 Santa Elena
 Santo Niño

Climate

Demographics

Economy 

Just a neighboring town of Daet, Talisay is often seen as a suburb of Daet due to its proximity to the town. Many warehouses have opened in the town. For those who can no longer find good space in Daet for living they can go to Talisay.

References

External links

 [ Philippine Standard Geographic Code]
Philippine Census Information

Municipalities of Camarines Norte